The International Federation of Pickleball (IFP) was created to act as the world governing body for the sport of pickleball. The IFP was founded in 2010 by the USA Pickleball Association (USAPA), now USA Pickleball (USAP). The IFP is a nonprofit organization that focuses its resources on providing support to national and local pickleball organizations.

The IFP's goals include creating and maintaining official rules across all of pickleball, organizing international tournaments, and most crucially, spreading the sport of pickleball across the world.
 The IFP's main goal is to have the sport of pickleball added to the Olympic Games.

The IFP also organizes international pickleball competitions including the Bainbridge Cup, an international competition in which teams represent their continents and compete on professional and amateur levels.

History 
The International Federation of Pickleball was founded in the wake of the first National Pickleball Open competition, held in Surprise, Arizona in 2009. The tournament was hosted by the USA Pickleball Association (USAPA) and drew almost 400 players from 26 American states and several Canadian provinces. The interest of the Canadians, among other factors, influenced the USAPA to establish a committee dedicated to the formation of an international governing body for pickleball. This committee was formed in 2010 and is considered to be the founding of the IFP. The IFP's constitution and bylaws were officially ratified in 2015 by its four inaugural member countries: the United States, Canada, Spain, and India. Since 2015, the IFP has steadily grown, adding over 20 countries to its ranks in the first half of 2021 alone. 

In 2018 a rival organization, the World Pickleball Federation (WPF), was formed by Seymour Rifkind, who had previously established the International Pickleball Teaching Professional Association (IPTPA). Both the IFP and WPF seek to promote pickleball worldwide, and both seek to obtain Olympic recognition for the sport.

On April 22, 2022, the United States, Canada, Mexico, Australia, England, France, Spain, Philippines, Finland, Cayman Islands and the Czech Republic withdrew their membership in the IFP reducing the number of member countries from 70 to 59. Subsequently, the IPF has continued to add new country memberships.

Structure

National and regional associations 

 there are 63 national organizations in the International Federation of Pickleball, including the special administrative region of Hong Kong, China. These national associations are organized into four categories: full members (1), Associate members (22), Affiliate members (37), and Provisional members (3). Each member country is organized under the umbrella of a continental federation. Full member countries can have members elected to the IFP's board of directors, while associate and affiliate member countries cannot.
 All member countries are required to follow the rules of pickleball as established by the IFP.

The IFP has five continental federations. These are the Asia Federation of Pickleball (AFP), North American Pickleball Federation, South American Pickleball Association, European Pickleball Federation (EPF), and Oceanic Pickleball Federation.

Overall, the IFP gives complete autonomy to member countries in their own nations, except if the actions of a member nation "affect the international image of the sport, the uniform application of one set of rules, or in some way affect the future Olympic status of the sport."

Board of directors  
The IFP's officers on the board are elected by the IFP's full member nations and serve two-year terms. The board consists of four officers, including the President, and lower-ranking members known as "At Large" members. The board may assign a maximum of six at-large members at any given time. The previous President is also reserved an "At Large" spot on the board.

Competitions

Bainbridge Cup 

The IFP hosts the annual Bainbridge Cup, one of the first international pickleball team tournaments. The tournament is named after Bainbridge Island, where pickleball was invented by Joel Pritchard and his colleagues. It consists of two teams representing geographical regions, usually continents. Originally, the tournament pitted players from Europe against those from North America. In the 2021 Bainbridge Cup, the tournament was organized as "east" versus "west", with players west of the Mississippi River and those from Asia on one team, and players east of the Mississippi and those from Europe on the other.

The tournament consists of divisions organized by age and skill level for men's, women's, and mixed doubles. Men's and women's singles were played for the first time at the Bainbridge Cup as a demonstration event in 2021. The inaugural competition was held in Madrid, Spain in 2017.

See also 
 List of pickleball organizations
 Glossary of pickleball terms

References

External links 
 

Pickleball organizations
International sports organizations
International organizations based in the United States
Sports organizations established in 2010
2010 establishments in Arizona